Theta Gruis, Latinized from θ Gruis, is a triple star system in the southern constellation of Grus. Its combined apparent visual magnitude is 4.28, which is bright enough to be seen with the naked eye. The system contains a magnetic Delta Delphini-like F5 star with a close fainter companion, plus a more distant G2 main sequence star.

References

Am stars
F-type main-sequence stars
G-type main-sequence stars
Triple star systems
Grus (constellation)
Gruis, Theta
218227
114131
8787
Durchmusterung objects